The Western Islands is a planning area located within the West Region of Singapore. It comprises a collection of islands located in the south-western waters of Singapore, namely Jurong, Bukum and Sudong Islands.

The Western Islands originally comprised 27 islands, once home to the native Malay islanders in the past. In the 1990s, the government decided to reclaim land to form one major island, called Jurong Island. It was subsequently formed from the amalgamation of several offshore islands, chiefly the seven main islands of Pulau Ayer Chawan, Pulau Ayer Merbau, Pulau Merlimau, Pulau Pesek, Pulau Pesek Kechil, Pulau Sakra and Pulau Soraya.

The planning area is located on the Singapore Straits, with Tuas situated to its west, as well as Pioneer, Boon Lay, Jurong East and Queenstown to its north. Western Islands planning area also shares a maritime boundary with the Southern Islands to its east.

Location
Although called 'Western Islands', the islands are not actually located on the west of the main island of Singapore. They are in fact located south-west of the main island. The islands are also relatively near to the Southern Islands.

Jurong Island

Jurong Island is the biggest and most important island among the Western Islands. It serves at the petroleum and petrochemical hub of the city-state, and it houses the third largest refining centre in the world. Jurong Island is home to over 94 petroleum, petrochemical, specialty chemical and supporting companies with more than S$26 billion in fixed assets investment on Jurong Island. Multinational companies such as ExxonMobil and Shell have established a strong presence on Jurong Island.

Jurong Island is linked to the main island by a 2.3 km causeway known as the Jurong Island Highway, opened in March 1999. Access to the island is restricted to persons who have a Jurong Island Security Pass. Other restrictions include that one must declare any photographic equipment that they are bringing to the island.

References

Places in Singapore
Western Islands Planning Area